The Kieler Nachrichten (literally "Kiel News") or KN  is the only German-language newspaper published in Kiel, Germany. It is published by "Kieler Zeitung Verlags und Druckerei KG-GmbH & Co.", a subdivision of Axel Springer AG which owns 24.5 percent of the company.  The newspaper's office is located at Asmus-Bremer-Platz between Holstenstraße and the Kiel city hall.

The KN was first published on 3 April 1946, with the permission of the British in occupied Germany after World War II. The newspaper later considered itself a successor to the Kieler Zeitung (founded 1864) and the Kieler Neueste Nachrichten (founded 1894).

In Rötger Feldmann's comic Werner,  the KN is known as the Kieler Nachtwächter ("Kiel Night Watchman").

External links 
 
  

Publications established in 1946
German-language newspapers
Mass media in Kiel
Newspapers published in Germany
Companies based in Kiel
German news websites